Brendan Patrick Kehoe (3 December 1970 – 19 July 2011) was an Irish software developer and author. Born in Dublin, Kehoe was raised in China, Maine, in the United States. In his early teens, he was first exposed to computing when he was given a Commodore 64 computer, which he used to teach himself about computing and computer networks. On leaving high-school, he moved to Widener University where he continued his computer studies, leaving in 1992.

Career 

Kehoe wrote two books and a number of technology articles in the specialist press (e.g., Boardwatch Magazine) on the topic of the Internet. His first book, Zen and the Art of the Internet: A Beginner's Guide, first published by Prentice Hall in July 1992, was the first mass-published user's guide to the Internet. Zen was written while Kehoe was still at Widener; he struck a bargain with the publishers to ensure that the original edition of the book would remain free-of-charge in the internet for everyone to access. In a survey taken by PC Magazine for the twentieth anniversary of the PC, Zen and the Art of the Internet was listed as one of the "top sci-fi/tech non-fiction books of the past twenty years" (1981–2001). It also appeared on Sergey Brin's "Favorite Booklist". As one of the first substantial books freely available for reuse on the Internet, Zen predated and helped to inspire the free culture movement.  Parts of it were reworked into other works including the Electronic Frontier Foundation's Guide to the Internet.

Kehoe was a dedicated and detailed programmer, who, as a student, volunteered changes to one of the most complex pieces of free software in the world at the time, the GNU C++ Compiler and Library.  His unusual skill at wrangling this code led to a full-time job as a key employee of Cygnus Support in Silicon Valley in 1992, improving, supporting and documenting this code base. By 1995 he was managing the entire GNU C++ group at Cygnus.

Later in life, Kehoe volunteered doing IT support for his local school, the Dalkey School Project. This led to positions as a member of its Board of Management, and from there to being Chairperson of the school. In 2010, he was appointed to the Board of Directors of Educate Together.

Kehoe was described by Eric S. Raymond after his death as "a true hacker and a gentleman". He is attributed as having coined the term "net-surfing" in a 1991 USENET post.

Personal life 

On 31 December 1993, Kehoe and a friend, Sven Heinicke, were involved in a serious car accident that left Kehoe with brain injuries including aphasia. He subsequently made an almost-full recovery, as there were still some brain issues lingering. He married on 5 October 1996 and lived in Dublin with his wife and two children.

At the beginning of March 2011, Kehoe was diagnosed with acute myeloid leukaemia. He underwent chemotherapy to fight the disease but succumbed to it on 19 July 2011.

References

Bibliography
Zen and the Art of the Internet: A Beginner's Guide, Brendan Kehoe, 1992, .
Children and the Internet: A Zen Guide for Parents and Educators, Brendan Kehoe and Victoria Mixon, 1996, .

External links
 Brendan Kehoe's domain
 First (and free) edition of Zen and the art of the Internet
 
 
 Computer Underground Digest article about Brendan's accident
 Interview, 8 March 2011, with Brendan about his accident on American Public Media's "The Story"
 Brendan Kehoe: an appreciation by Diarmaid Mac Aonghusa in the Sunday Business Post, 24 July 2011
 Interview with Brendan including a demo of browsing the Internet on The Computer Chronicles, 1993.  Also, archived version.

1970 births
2011 deaths
Deaths from leukemia
Irish technology writers
People from China, Maine
Irish computer programmers
Irish computer scientists